Do Rudi Narun (also Romanized as Do Rūdī Narūn) is a village in Taftan-e Jonubi Rural District, Nukabad District, Khash County, Sistan and Baluchestan Province, Iran. At the 2006 census, its population was 332, in 59 families.

References 

Populated places in Khash County